is a passenger railway station in located in the city of Hikone,  Shiga Prefecture, Japan, operated by the private railway operator Ohmi Railway.

Lines
Hikoneguchi Station is served by the Ohmi Railway Main Line, and is located 7.8 rail kilometers from the terminus of the line at Maibara Station.

Station layout
The station consists of two opposed side platforms connected to the station building by a level crossing. The station building is unattended.

Platform

Adjacent stations

History
It was renamed to its present name on January 1, 1917.

Passenger statistics
In fiscal 2019, the station was used by an average of 634 passengers daily (boarding passengers only).

Surrounding area
Shiga Prefectural Hikone Shoseikan High School
National Printing Bureau Hikone Factory
Hikone Driving School

See also
List of railway stations in Japan

References

External links

  Ohmi Railway official site

Railway stations in Shiga Prefecture
Railway stations in Japan opened in 1901
Hikone, Shiga